Marlowe Peyton (born August 2, 2004) is an American actor and singer.

Life and career
Marlowe Peyton was born in Glendale, California, the younger of two children. They have an older sister named Merit Leighton, who is also an actress. They began their career when they were four in The Back-up Plan. Since then, they have appeared as Lucy, cousin to the Heck family on The Middle; their performance was nominated for a Young Artist Award. They are also known for their guest star role on Jessie, playing the daughter of Coach Penny. Peyton is the voice of Jingle in Santa Paws 2: The Santa Pups from Disney and also played Tanner on ABC's The Neighbors. They previously starred opposite Finola Hughes, Shane Harper and Kathryn McCormick in Platinum the Dance Movie.

Personal life 
Peyton is non-binary.

Filmography

Awards and nominations

References

External links

Marlowe Peyton’s official website

Living people
People from Glendale, California
2004 births
Actors from California
American child actors
American television actors
American film actors
American non-binary actors
21st-century American actors